Alan Vitalyevich Koroyev (born 19 April 1998) is a Russian football player.

Club career
He made his debut in the Russian Professional Football League for Kolomna on 28 August 2016 in a game against Tekstilshchik Ivanovo.

References

External links
 
 Profile by Russian Professional Football League
 
 
 Profile at Crimean Football Union

1998 births
Sportspeople from North Ossetia–Alania
Living people
Russian footballers
Association football forwards
Russian expatriate footballers
Russian expatriate sportspeople in Armenia
Russian expatriate sportspeople in Belarus
Expatriate footballers in Belarus
Expatriate footballers in Armenia
Russian Second League players
Armenian First League players
Belarusian Premier League players
Crimean Premier League players
FC Spartak Vladikavkaz players
PFC CSKA Moscow players
FC Krasnodar players
FC Sevastopol (Russia) players
FC Khimik-Arsenal players
FC Slutsk players
FC Okean Kerch players